Josef Nicolai Newgarden (born December 22, 1990) is an American race car driver who competes in the IndyCar Series full-time for Team Penske. He is the 2017 and 2019 IndyCar Series Champion and 2011 Indy Lights champion.

Career

Karting
Newgarden's first race vehicle was a motorized scooter purchased at a skate shop in Hendersonville, Tennessee. In 2001, Newgarden competed in events across the country. After a year of this, his father purchased a kart.

When he was 13, he and his family ventured outside of Tennessee to find a competitive kart racing environment. This led Newgarden to a kart racing facility in New Castle, Indiana that had recently been launched by IndyCar driver Mark Dismore. In an order to stay efficient with funding, Newgarden focused on local and regional championships rather than competing nationally.

In his first year of karting (2005), Newgarden finished 2nd and 3rd in the Kart Racers of America (KRA) Junior Can Championship.  He also competed in the TAG world championships that year in the junior division, securing the title.

2006 was his most successful year in karting; he secured two championships in the KRA Junior Can division and repeated as the TAG World Champion in the junior division.

He went on to compete in junior car racing in 2007 but returned to karting several times, racing in the highly competitive Robo-Pong 200 at New Castle Motorsports Park multiple times over the next few years. He won the 200-mile endurance race twice, with both successes coming with members of the Dismore family as his teammates (Mark Dismore Sr in 2011 and Mark Dismore Jr in 2013).

Early formula car racing

Skip Barber 
Newgarden started his open-wheel car career in the Skip Barber Racing School series in 2006. He finished as runner-up in the Southern Regional Series with three wins and another seven podium places. He next competed in the 2007 BFGoodrich / Skip Barber National Presented by Mazda championship, finishing sixth with two wins. Newgarden remained in the series for 2008 and improved to second place, with three wins.

Formula Ford

After the 2008 season, Newgarden was selected for the Team USA scholarship to compete at the Formula Ford Festival and Walter Hayes Trophy. He would secure the Formula Ford Festival title, becoming the only American to ever do so.

At the Walter Hayes Trophy event, Newgarden would win all of the qualifying races leading to the main event.  He would also start the event from the pole position.  Unfortunately, mid-way through a rain-stricken race, Newgarden crashed from the lead, finishing 6th place.

In 2009, he would move to England to compete in the British Formula Ford Championship and start his European career. He would finish runner-up in 2009, leading the series in total race wins and amassing 550 points.

Formula Palmer Audi
Newgarden competed in the opening round of the 2009 Formula Palmer Audi season at Brands Hatch, taking two wins and a fourth in the third race.

GP3 Series

In 2010, Newgarden competed in the newly formed 2010 GP3 Series with Carlin Motorsport. 2010 would end in Josef's most disappointing championship position of his young career, finishing 18th in the points. The season was highlighted by a pole position at Hockenheimring and a best finish of fifth at the season finale at Monza.

Indy Lights

At the start of 2011, Newgarden would return home to the United States to compete in the Indy Lights Series with Sam Schmidt Motorsports. He won his first Indy Lights race in the season opener on the Streets of St. Petersburg. He followed his opening win in St. Petersburg with four more wins and ten podium finishes out of thirteen races in 2011, clinching him the points championship with one race to go. In New Hampshire, the 11th race of 2011, Newgarden lapped the entire field and went on to win. He was the first Indy Lights driver to do this since Thiago Medeiros in March 2004.   Josef, as a rookie, would also lead the series with the most number of wins for the 2011 season.

IndyCar

2012–2014: Sarah Fisher Hartman Racing 
On December 7, 2011, Newgarden was announced as the driver for Sarah Fisher Hartman Racing.  It is quite rare in IndyCar for a rookie driver to be offered a multi-year contract but Fisher and her team saw promise in Newgarden; SFH was viewed as the smallest outfit in the series and Newgarden was certainly headed for a significant challenge in his first entry into professional motorsport. He competed in IndyCar from 2012 to 2014 with Fisher's team, steadily progressing and improving with each weekend.  He would earn his first podium at the 2013 race in Baltimore. 2014 would be his standout year with SFHR, he would very nearly secure wins at both Long Beach and Mid-Ohio, and would stand on his second career podium at Iowa Speedway.

2015: CFH Racing 
During his fourth full season in IndyCar, Newgarden raced under the merged team of Sarah Fisher and Ed Carpenter. Under this new team banner Newgarden started 2015 strong, finishing in 12th position at St. Petersburg and improving his position with each race.

During the fourth race weekend in the 2015 season at Barber Motorsports Park, Newgarden earned his first Indycar Series victory at the 2015 Honda Indy Grand Prix of Alabama, moving from 5th to 2nd on the first lap of the race, and leading the most laps on the way to a 2.2-second win.

Proving that his win wasn't luck he would win again later in the season at the 2015 Honda Indy Toronto and finished the 2015 season 7th in the standings with 431 points, a personal best in IndyCar.

2016: Ed Carpenter Racing 
Sarah Fisher ended her participation in IndyCar after the 2015 season, leaving Newgarden to drive for the reformed Ed Carpenter Racing.
Newgarden started the 2016 season strong with a podium at the 2016 Honda Indy Grand Prix of Alabama at Barber Motorsports Park. He barely missed pole position during qualifying for the 2016 Indy 500 and started in the middle of the front row. He finished the 100th running of the Indy 500 in a strong 3rd.

At the 2016 Firestone 600 at Texas Motor Speedway Newgarden crashed hard into the wall, breaking both his hand and clavicle. Remarkably, he returned to the car two weeks later, working his way to a top 10 spot at the 2016 Kohler Grand Prix at Road America.

Only 28 days after his crash at Texas, Newgarden won the 2016 Iowa Corn 300 in dominating fashion, leading 282 of 300 laps. A remarkable achievement with a broken hand and shoulder.

At IndyCar's return to Watkins Glen International, the 2016 Grand Prix at the Glen, Newgarden claimed another podium, finishing 2nd. After a 6th-place finish at the 2016 GoPro Grand Prix of Sonoma, he finished the season in fourth place overall in the season standings. In a testament to their hard work and success, Newgarden and ECR would finish the season as the highest non-Team Penske car in the series, a considerable feat for a small team.

2017–present: Team Penske 

On September 29, 2016, ECR owner Ed Carpenter confirmed that Newgarden would not be back with the team in 2017. Newgarden moved to Team Penske for the 2017 season, with the team making an official announcement on October 5.

Newgarden won his first race with Team Penske during round 3 of the 2017 season at Barber Motorsports Park; clinching the victory after a duel with Scott Dixon in the final laps. Newgarden moved into the IndyCar points lead following back to back victories at Toronto and Mid Ohio.

At Gateway, Newgarden held off his teammates and Scott Dixon to clinch his fourth series victory of the season but not without controversy as late in the race, Newgarden went under teammate Simon Pagenaud very late going into Turn 1.  After bumping tires, both continued but, as Pagenaud nearly hit the wall, he was not pleased with his teammate's move. The following week at Watkins Glen, Newgarden had a sizable cushion in the points over second-place Dixon. Coming back onto the track after a pit stop under green on cold tires, he lost control of the car as Sébastien Bourdais made contact with him damaging the suspension. Newgarden ended up leaving the Glen with a three-point lead, later a four-point lead as he won the pole for Sonoma, setting a track record. Newgarden needed to finish 4th or higher regardless of Pagenaud's result and he finished 2nd to clinch his first title. Newgarden became the first American born driver to win the Astor Cup since Ryan Hunter-Reay in 2012.

Newgarden won the opening race of the 2019 season at St. Petersburg and followed that up with wins at Detroit, Texas and Iowa. He led the points standings after every race except the Indy 500 where Team Penske teammate Simon Pagenaud led from the pole position. Newgarden won his second IndyCar title at Laguna Seca by only 25 points.

Newgarden started his second title defense slowly in 2020, a season shorted by the COVID-19 pandemic. Although he finished third at the opener in Texas he found himself in an early-season slump that put him in a hole to rival Scott Dixon. By mid-season and toward the final stretch he produced a series of wins and podium finishes that set him up for a title-deciding showdown with Dixon at the final round in St. Petersburg. Newgarden could only win the championship if he won the race and Dixon either retired or finished no better than ninth. During the race, Newgarden overtook Pato O'Ward in the closing laps after a restart and held onto the lead for his second consecutive win in St. Petersburg but ultimately failed to defend his title when Dixon finished third.

2021 would be an up-and-down year for Newgarden and Team Penske. Despite earning a season leading four pole positions, he would not pick up a win until the tenth round of the season at Mid Ohio. The win was Newgarden's nineteenth in IndyCar, making him the most successful American driver currently active in the series. Newgarden picked up a second win at Gateway. Heading into the final race of the season at Long Beach, Newgarden was one of only three drivers mathematically in contention for the title alongside Alex Palou and Pato O'Ward.  Newgarden finished second in the race, giving him a second-place finish in the championship for the second consecutive year.

Newgarden would be an at times dominant and at times inconsistent force in 2022. He set a career high in wins in a season with five; winning Texas, Long Beach, Road America, Iowa, and Gateway. This would be the most wins by an IndyCar driver in one season since 2016, when former teammate Simon Pagenaud won five races. Newgarden's best finish on the season outside of his five wins was a fourth place at Detroit, putting him in a deficit for the championship heading into the season finale. At the second race in Iowa Newgarden suffered a massive crash due to a mechanical failure while leading the race. Although he was able to exit the car on his own power and walked away he collapsed shortly afterwards in the driver's motorhome lot, after which he was airlifted to a hospital in Des Moines for further evaluation. Newgarden was later cleared to race in the following weekend's Gallagher Grand Prix. Heading into the season finale at Laguna Seca Newgarden was one of five drivers in contention for the series title alongside his Penske teammates Will Power and Scott McLaughlin along with Scott Dixon and Marcus Ericsson. Although Newgarden mounted a furious charge from 25th to 2nd at Laguna Seca he was ultimately unsuccessful at clinching his third championship, finishing second in the standings to Will Power.

Other Racing

Josef participated in the 2018 Race of Champions in Riyadh, Saudi Arabia and the 2019 Race of Champions at Autodromo Hermanos Rodríguez in Mexico City, Mexico, both times for Team USA.

On February 23, 2022, it was announced that Josef would be a guest driver in Tony Stewart's Superstar Racing Experience at the Nashville Fairgrounds Speedway, in Josef's hometown of Nashville.

On December 5, 2022 Newgarden announced that he would be teaming up with fellow Team Penske IndyCar driver Scott McLaughlin and Indy NXT driver Kyffin Simpson would be entering the 2023 24 Hours of Daytona with an LMP2 entry.

Personal life
Newgarden was born in Nashville, Tennessee to Joey and Tina Newgarden, who had moved from New York in the 1980s with the family photography business. Josef is half Danish via his mother. He credits watching racing on TV at an early age with his father, who was an avid fan of NASCAR, IndyCar and Formula 1, as what got him into the sport.

Newgarden grew up in Hendersonville, Tennessee and attended Pope John Paul II High School, where he was friends with and a former classmate of NFL Pro Bowl wide receiver Golden Tate. Additionally, he was a former classmate of NASCAR driver Josh Berry in the 7th and 8th grades.

Before starting racing, Newgarden played baseball, football and basketball.

On October 7, 2018, Newgarden announced that he and his longtime girlfriend, Ashley Welch, had gotten engaged while on a trip to Japan. They were married in the fall of 2019 in Nashville.

On April 20, 2022, Newgarden’s wife Ashley gave birth to their first child, Kota Nicolai Newgarden.

Media appearances
Along with fellow racers Tony Kanaan and Helio Castroneves, he competed in the Indianapolis round of season 8 of American Ninja Warrior in 2016.

Newgarden is the driver ambassador for the SeriousFun Children's Network, a charity started by actor and race team owner Paul Newman. Newgarden is also a talented ping-pong player.  He hosts an annual celebrity tournament during May that raises funds for the Serious Fun Children's Network.  In 2019, the tournament raised over $100,000 for the charity.

Newgarden is an avid gamer and is currently a Brand Ambassador for the Microsoft title Forza Motorsport.  His voice is featured in the game and he is frequently featured in Forza content.

He was featured on several episodes of CMT's Nashville Squares during the fall of 2019.

Racing record

Career summary

Complete GP3 Series results
(key) (Races in bold indicate pole position)

American open–wheel racing results
(key)

Indy Lights

IndyCar Series

Indianapolis 500

Superstar Racing Experience
(key) * – Most laps led. 1 – Heat 1 winner. 2 – Heat 2 winner.

Complete IMSA SportsCar Championship results
(key) (Races in bold indicate pole position; results in italics indicate fastest lap)

† Points only counted towards the Michelin Endurance Cup, and not the overall LMP2 Championship.
* Season still in progress.

References

External links

 
 
 
 IndyCar 36: Josef Newgarden - 2012 IndyCar documentary
 IndyCar 36: Josef Newgarden - 2013 IndyCar documentary

1990 births
American Ninja Warrior contestants
American people of Danish descent
Formula Ford drivers
Formula Palmer Audi drivers
American GP3 Series drivers
Indianapolis 500 drivers
Indy Lights champions
Indy Lights drivers
IndyCar Series champions
IndyCar Series drivers
Living people
Racing drivers from Nashville, Tennessee
Racing drivers from Tennessee
Sportspeople from Nashville, Tennessee
Carlin racing drivers
Arrow McLaren SP drivers
Sarah Fisher Racing drivers
Ed Carpenter Racing drivers
Team Penske drivers
WeatherTech SportsCar Championship drivers